Grand Hotel Toplice is a five-star deluxe hotel in Bled, Slovenia.

History
In 1850, Hotel Luisenbad was built on the site of today's Toplice by Josef Luckmann. Hotel shortly became a meeting point for Austrian elite as well as a vacation destination for wealthy foreigners. In 1894, it featured thermal baths, a casino and an oriental coffee house.

After the dissolution of Austria-Hungary in 1918, the hotel was renamed to Grand Hotel Toplice by the new owner. In 1931, the hotel opened again after it was renovated by Austrian architect Franz Baumgartner. Since then, prominent visitors often resided here as Bled became a diplomatic haven after King Alexander I of Yugoslavia and later Josip Broz Tito chose this alpine resort as their summer residence.

Today, Grand Hotel Toplice still has its charm and is frequented by guests from all over the world.

The hotel is incorporated into Small Luxury Hotels of The World and Sava Hotels & Resorts consortium.

Famous guests
Famous residents:
Aleksander I Obrenović, King of Serbia
Arthur Miller, American writer
Ignazio Silone, Italian author
Pablo Neruda, Chilean poet
Agatha Christie, British Author
Chris Barnard, South African cardiac surgeon
Franz Josef Strauss, Bavarian minister-president
Hussein I, King of Jordan 
Willy Brandt, West German Chancellor
Baron Carrington British Foreign Secretary
Madeleine Albright US Secretary of State

External links 

Hotels in Slovenia
Hotel buildings completed in 1850